Cambrian Stage 4 is the still unnamed fourth stage of the Cambrian and the upper stage of Cambrian Series 2. It follows Cambrian Stage 3 and lies below the Wuliuan. The lower boundary has not been formally defined by the International Commission on Stratigraphy. One proposal is the first appearance of two trilobite genera, Olenellus or Redlichia. Another proposal is the first appearance of the trilobite species Arthricocephalus chauveaui. Both proposals will set the lower boundary close to  million years ago. The upper boundary corresponds to the beginning of the Wuliuan.

Naming
The International Commission on Stratigraphy has not named the fourth stage of the Cambrian yet. In the widely used Siberian nomenclature stage 4 would overlap with parts of the Botomian and Toyonian.

Biostratigraphy
The beginning of Cambrian Stage 4 has been tentatively correlated with the base of the European Leonian faunal stage and the base of the South China Duyunian faunal stage.

References
 http://www.palaeontology.geo.uu.se/ISCS/ISCS_working_groups.html

Cambrian geochronology
Geological ages
Cambrian Series 2